Lagg is a hamlet on southern coast of the Isle of Arran in Scotland made up of a few houses and a hotel. The hamlet is within the parish of Kilmory.

History
The name "Lagg" means "The hollow". The family-run hotel has a restaurant and bar and is the oldest inn on Arran, dating back to 1791. The old public bar has been refurbished into a cycling-based cafe, serving cakes and light lunches. Red squirrels are abundant and can be seen roaming around the hotel's garden. 
 
There are various cairns near Lagg on either side of the local river, reached by a forest footpath, named 'lover's lane' near the bridge that follows the riverbank south towards the sea. The sandy beaches here are some of the best in Scotland.

People from Lagg

David Lees FRSE (1881–1934), public health expert

References

External links
Canmore - Arran, Lagg, General site record
Canmore - Arran, Lagg Hotel site record

Villages in the Isle of Arran